Tokura (written: 都倉, 戸倉 or 十倉) is a Japanese surname. Notable people with the surname include:

, Japanese association football player
, Japanese association football player
, Japanese composer
, Japanese physicist

Fictional characters
, a character in the manga series Rainy Cocoa
, a character in the manga series Slow Start
, a character in the media franchise Cardfight!! Vanguard

Japanese-language surnames